Genuine may refer to:

Companies 
Genuine Parts Company, a Fortune 1000 company that was founded in 1928
Genuine Scooters, a Chicago-based scooter manufacturer
Genuine Games, a video game company founded in early 2002

Music 
Genuine (Stacie Orrico album), 2000
Genuine (Fayray album), 2001
"Genuine" (song), a 2000 song by Stacie Orrico
"Genuine", a 1995 song by Canadian singer-songwriter Mae Moore

Other uses 
Genuine (film), a 1920 silent film by Robert Wiene
Genuine, a difficulty rating in Dance Dance Revolution
Genuine (horse), a Japanese Thoroughbred racehorse
Authenticity (philosophy)